The Xian H-8 bomber was a Chinese military aircraft and a possible successor to the aging twin-engined Xian H-6 jet bomber. It is referred to as Xian H-7 in some sources. The proposed designs were reported to be an enlarged H-6 with four or six underwing engines, but the project was canceled in 1971 in early development stage.

Development
On 23 March 1970 the No.603 Research Institute was tasked with developing a strategic bomber to be designated H-8, to reduce costs and development time the Xian H-6 airframe was used as a baseline. The first working sample was expected to be completed in 1973, and production was expected to be as early as in 1974.

However, the development of the H-8 paced slowly and came to a halt as major development resource was transferred to Shanghai Y-10. In September 1971, the H-8 project was canceled, whilst the H-6I was continued on as a substitute.

Variants
Xian H-8I – Two powerplant options were studied, using four WS-6J (Type 910) turbofans or six Pratt & Whitney JT-3D turbofans but no aircraft were built.
Xian H-8II – A H-6 with increased wing span, powered by six WS-6J turbofans in evenly spaced nacelles, and possibly a re-designed flight-deck with an extended solid nose. No aircraft were built.
 Xiaohong - A small bomber.

Specifications

See also

References

1970s Chinese bomber aircraft
Cancelled military aircraft projects of China
H-08
Quadjets
High-wing aircraft